Life Without Sound is the fourth studio album by the American indie rock band Cloud Nothings, released on January 27, 2017 on Carpark Records. The album was produced and mixed by John Goodmanson, and is the first to feature guitarist Chris Brown.

Reception

According to Metacritic, Life Without Sound has received an aggregated score of 79 out of 100 based on 23 reviews, indicating "generally favorable reviews".

Accolades

Track listing

Charts

References 

2017 albums
Cloud Nothings albums
Carpark Records albums
Albums produced by John Goodmanson
Albums recorded at Sonic Ranch